Gavur Castle, formerly known as Ghiaour and Giaour castle, all meaning infidel's castle (from Gavur), is a castle located in the Dereköy neighborhood of Haymana, on the road to the Kara Ömerli neighborhood.

History 
As a result of the researches, it was determined that it was built between 1600 and 1700 BC, during the years when the Hittites ruled. There are 2 distinct soldier reliefs on the outer walls of the castle and a woman depiction that can hardly be seen with the naked eye today. The excavation of the Gavur Castle was at the request of Atatürk.

Gallery

References 

Hittites
Hittite sites in Turkey
Buildings and structures completed in the 2nd millennium BC
Haymana, Ankara
Archaeological sites in Turkey